Northpark Copse is a  Site of special scientific interest which is east of Shalfleet. The site was notified in 1986 for its biological features.

References
Natural England citation sheet

Sites of Special Scientific Interest on the Isle of Wight